Orville Walter Fehlhaber (March 16, 1903 – February 15, 1986) was an American lawyer and politician.

Born in Wausau, Wisconsin, Fehlhaber received his bachelor's degree from University of Wisconsin–Madison and his law degree from University of Wisconsin Law School. He practiced law in Wausau, Wisconsin. Fehlhaber served in the Wisconsin State Assembly in 1941 and was a Republican. He died in Bradenton, Florida.

Notes

1903 births
1986 deaths
Politicians from Wausau, Wisconsin
University of Wisconsin–Madison alumni
University of Wisconsin Law School alumni
Wisconsin lawyers
20th-century American politicians
20th-century American lawyers
Republican Party members of the Wisconsin State Assembly